Dynamite Denny is a 1932 American drama film directed by Frank R. Strayer from an original screenplay by W. Scott Darling. The film stars Jay Wilsey, Blanche Mehaffey, and William V. Mong. Produced by Action Pictures, it was distributed through Mayfair pictures, and was released on May 27, 1932.

Cast list
 Jay Wilsey as Denny
 Blanche Mehaffey as Mary, chairman of the board's daughter
 William V. Mong as William B. Marston, chairman of the board
 Walter Perry as Jim Dayton
 Matthew Betz as Labor agitator
 Fern Emmett as Marston's Nurse

References

External links
 
 
 

1932 films
American black-and-white films
American drama films
1932 drama films
Mayfair Pictures films
Films directed by Frank R. Strayer
1930s American films
1930s English-language films